Tayla Thorn (born 31 May 1998) is an Australian rules footballer who played for Adelaide and  Gold Coast in the AFL Women's (AFLW).

Early life
Thorn was born in Darwin, Northern Territory to a family of Indigenous Australian (Iwaidja) descent. She was raised in the small town of Humpty Doo, playing football with cousin Nakia Cockatoo and others. She was captain of the first Indigenous Northern Territory representative side, and won a "best and fairest" award at her home club, St Mary’s. That same year, she was named in the Youth Girls All-Stars Team.

AFL Women's career

Adelaide
Thorn was drafted by Adelaide with the club's twelfth pick in the 2016 AFL Women's draft. Thorn had previously moved to Melbourne to study accounting, and returned to the Top End to join the Darwin group of Adelaide players. She was the youngest player in the Crows' inaugural AFLW team. Thorn made her debut in the club's inaugural match, in round 1 of 2017 against Greater Western Sydney. After playing in ruck and defence in her debut, she impressed the club with her effective tagging against Western Bulldogs marquee player Katie Brennan in round 2. Thorn was omitted in round 5, but returned in round 6 to play against  in front of her home crowd at TIO Stadium in Darwin. Despite missing two rounds, she was one of the leading tacklers in the league. Thorn was not re-signed during the 2017 trade period.

Gold Coast
In August 2019 she signed with the next expansion team, Gold Coast. At the end of the season, she was delisted.

Personal life
She has a large family, including seventeen sisters. Thorn was featured in a documentary, League of Her Own, telecast nationally by the Seven Network. As of March 2017, she works as an administrator for AFL Northern Territory at the Michael Long Learning and Leadership Centre. The Michael Long Learning and Leadership Centre is a major sports facility where the Crows train in Darwin, and is also a notable educational centre for indigenous Australians.

References

External links

Living people
1998 births
Adelaide Football Club (AFLW) players
Australian rules footballers from the Northern Territory
Indigenous Australian players of Australian rules football
Gold Coast Football Club (AFLW) players